Chen Han-hung (born 21 December 1976) is a Taiwanese diver. He competed at the 1996 Summer Olympics and the 2000 Summer Olympics.

References

1976 births
Living people
Taiwanese male divers
Olympic divers of Taiwan
Divers at the 1996 Summer Olympics
Divers at the 2000 Summer Olympics
Place of birth missing (living people)